Ian Bryce (born 1956) is an English film producer.  Starting as a production assistant on Return of the Jedi, he is now an award-winning film producer. He now lives with his two children, Alex and Mac, and his wife Taylor, in Los Angeles, California.

Career
Bryce has won and been nominated for many awards, including multiple Golden Globe Awards, Academy Awards and BAFTA nominations for his work as a producer.  For Steven Spielberg's World War II drama Saving Private Ryan, he won a Golden Globe Award and nominations from the "Academy Awards" and BAFTA. The film was one of the top-grossing films of 1998.  Almost Famous, another Bryce production, received a BAFTA Best Film award in 2000. Bryce co-produced all the films of the Transformers series, one of the biggest movie franchises of the 21st century.

Personal life
Bryce grew up in Bristol, England, but moved to the US when he was a young adult. After marrying his wife Taylor, they moved to Los Angeles. They have two kids, Mac Bryce, and Alex Bryce.

Filmography

Other credits

See also
List of accolades received by Almost Famous
1998 in film

References

External links

"PRODUCED BY 2009" (Producers Guild of America)

1956 births
English film producers
English emigrants to the United States
Living people
People from Totnes